A cream pie, crème pie, or creme pie is a type of pie filled with a rich custard or pudding that is made from milk, cream, sugar, wheat flour, and eggs. It comes in many forms, including vanilla, lemon, lime, peanut butter, banana, coconut, and chocolate.  One feature of most cream pies is a whipped cream topping. The custard filling is related to crème patissière, a key component of French cakes, and tarts. It is a one-crust pie, where the crust covers the bottom and sides but not the top. The crust may be a standard pastry pie crust, or made with crumbled cookies or a graham cracker crust.

Most cream pies are made with a cooked custard filling. The "Magic Lemon Cream Pie", invented at Borden and attributed to their fictional spokesperson, Jane Ellison, is instead thickened by the room-temperature curdling of a mixture of sweetened condensed milk, eggs, and lemon juice. This later evolved into Key lime pie.

Pieing

Cream pies are often associated with comedians who use them as a gimmick in their routines, with the pie being pushed against someone's face. When used for show business purposes, cream pies are generally mock-up pies made from only canned whipped cream or, in some instances, shaving cream in order to avoid curdling under hot stage lights. Pieing is the act of throwing a pie at a person or people. This can be a political action when the target is an authority figure, politician, or celebrity and can be used as a means of protesting against the target's political beliefs, or against perceived arrogance or vanity. Perpetrators sometimes generally regard the act as a form of ridicule intended to embarrass and humiliate the victim. In most or all US jurisdictions, pieing is punishable as battery, and may constitute assault as well. Some political activists throw cream pies onto the faces of politicians to shame them and humiliate them (e.g., les Entartistes).

Gallery

See also

 List of pies, tarts and flans

References

Custard desserts
Sweet pies
American pies
German pies
Foods containing coconut